True till Death may refer to:

 True till Death (EP), an EP by Chain of Strength
 True till Death (Death Before Dishonor album)